Flex & Shanice was an American reality television series starring Flex Alexander and Shanice Wilson. It premiered on November 1, 2014 on the Oprah Winfrey Network, as part of its Saturday-night reality lineup.

Episodes

Season 1 (2014)

Season 2 (2015)

Season 3 (2016)

References

2010s American reality television series
2014 American television series debuts
2016 American television series endings
English-language television shows
Oprah Winfrey Network original programming